The Autostrada A19 is a  motorway on the island of Sicily that links Palermo to Catania. The motorway from Palermo follows the Tyrrhenian coast eastwards for 46 km and then turns south to go over the Madonie mountains and across the centre of the island to descend into the plain of Catania.

The motorway is connected to the A20 Messina-Palermo and is linked to the A18 Catania-Messina by the RA15 (Catania's Ring Road-West).

Palermo - Catania

A19
Transport in Sicily